Mícheál P. O'Higgins is an Irish lawyer who was nominated to be a judge of the High Court in January 2023. He was formerly a barrister and chair of the Council of the Bar of Ireland.

Early life 
O'Higgins obtained a BCL degree from University College Dublin in 1988.

Legal career 
He was called to the Bar of Ireland in 1990 and became a senior counsel in 2008. His practice focused on public law and criminal law cases.

He acted for the Garda Commissioner at the Disclosures Tribunal and for Michael Fingleton in action taken by the liquidators of Irish Nationwide Building Society.

He was elected chair of the Council of the Bar of Ireland in July 2018 and served a two-year term.

Judicial career 
He was nominated for appointment to the High Court in January 2023.

Personal life 
He is married to Paula and has four children.

References

Living people
Year of birth missing (living people)

High Court judges (Ireland)

Irish barristers

Alumni of University College Dublin

Alumni of King's Inns